is an EP released by The Gazette on July 30, 2003.

The songs from this release are featured on the compilation album Dainihon Itangeishateki Noumiso Gyaku Kaiten Zekkyou Ongenshuu, along with the tracks from Akuyuukai and Cockayne Soup.

Track listing

Notes
The title, "Spermargarita" is a Japanese pun combining the words sperm (スペルマ) and margarita (マルガリィタ). "Super Margarita" and "Spell Margarita" are common mistranslations.
"Wakaremichi" is a re-recording of the initial track from the Wakaremichi single, released in 2002.
'Spermargarita' was reissued in 2005.

References

The Gazette (band) albums
2003 EPs

ja:スペルマルガリィタ